Chan Pine Ridge is a village in the Orange Walk District of the nation of Belize. It is a predominantly Maya Mestizo village with Spanish being the preferred language of communication. English is taught at the Chan Pine Ridge Government School which is the only Primary School serving the community. Kriol is also spoken among the villagers. The Name Chan Pine Ridge is a combination of the Yucatec Maya word Chan meaning "small" in English and Pine Ridge which is English. 

Populated places in Orange Walk District
Orange Walk East